The Secret War of Jackie's Girls is a 1980 American TV movie that was conceived as a pilot but never went to series. It is about female pilots who undertake secret missions in World War II. The pilot was directed by Gordon Hessler.

Cast
Lee Purcell
Mariette Hartley
Dee Wallace

Production
The success of Charlie's Angels in the 1976-77 ratings season prompted all the American TV networks to feature more sexy young women in action-orientated roles, either adding them to existing programs or introducing new shows that focused on them.  NBC picked up The Bionic Woman from ABC and also added young female characters to the 1977-78 seasons of Baa Baa Black Sheep and BJ and the Bear. They introduced several new shows with female sex symbol leads such as Quark, The Roller Girls and Who's Watching the Kids?, as well as commissioning pilots for several series which were direct imitations of Charlie's Angels: The Secret War of Jackie's Girls, The Hunted Lady and Cover Girls.

Reception
The Los Angeles Times said "the aerial photography... is quite marvellous."

References

Notes

External links

Secret War of Jackie's Girls at BFI

1980 television films
1980 films
American television films
Films directed by Gordon Hessler
1980s English-language films